Miracle in Viggiù (Italian: Miracolo a Viggiù) is a 1951 Italian comedy film by Luigi Giachino and starring Teddy Reno, Silvana Pampanini and Antonella Lualdi. The film's sets were designed by the art director Mario Grazzini.

Cast
 Teddy Reno as Sonny Boy
 Silvana Pampanini as 	Pinuccia
 Antonella Lualdi as 	Antonella
 Beniamino Maggio as 	Amleto
 Adriana Serra as Flora
 Enzo Furlai as 	Krauss

References

Bibliography 
 Chiti, Roberto & Poppi, Roberto. Dizionario del cinema italiano: Dal 1945 al 1959. Gremese Editore, 1991.

External links
 

1951 films
1950s Italian-language films
Italian comedy films
1951 comedy films
Italian black-and-white films
1950s Italian films